Lunggar Township is a small settlement in Zhongba County of Shigatse Prefecture, part of the Tibet Autonomous Region in China.

See also
List of towns and villages in Tibet

Populated places in Shigatse
Township-level divisions of Tibet
Zhongba County